Family with sequence similarity 155, member A is a protein that in humans is encoded by the FAM155A gene.

References

Further reading 

 
 
 
 
 

Genes on human chromosome 13